iSQUARE is a 31-storey high shopping centre located at 63 Nathan Road, Tsim Sha Tsui, Kowloon, Hong Kong, on the former site of the Hyatt Regency Hotel. It was developed by the Associated International Hotels Ltd.

Introduction
iSQUARE Shopping mall was designed by architecture firms Rocco Design Ltd and Benoy. It has an approximately  retail space area for shopping, entertainment and iTOWER. it is situated at the intersection of Nathan Road and Peking Road, iSQUARE was the first shopping and entertainment complex linked to Tsim Sha Tsui MTR station. The retail space area is located from the basement to level 8. On level 7, there are five cinemas which provide 1,000 seats. iTOWER has 20 storeys and there are several restaurants inside, allowing customers a view of the Victoria Harbour. One of the levels is occupied by Associated International Hotels Ltd. It was built by Gammon Construction and completed in 2009.

Features
iSQUARE's exterior wall comprises more than 4,000 glass and special components. The Peking Road entrance has an LED screen playing different types of animation, and the LB floor also has a projection device wall.

Retail space
It has over 140 shops.

Construction photos

References

External links

 Official website

Shopping centres in Hong Kong
Tsim Sha Tsui
IMAX venues